Roper is a craftsman who makes ropes; a ropemaker.

It may also refer to:

Places
Roper, North Carolina, USA
Roper River, Northern Territory, Australia

People 

 Roper (surname)

Other
Roper v. Simmons, a decision of the United States Supreme Court
Roper resonance, an unstable subatomic particle
Roper Technologies, American industrial company 
Roper-Logan-Tierney model of nursing
USS Roper (DD-147), an American navy ship
Roper, a style of cowboy boot with a short heel and round toe
Ropers, mascots of the Will Rogers High School
Roper, a Whirlpool Corporation brand of household appliances
Roper (band), an American Christian pop-punk band
The Ropers, an American sitcom
Roper (Dungeons & Dragons), a magical beast in a fantasy role playing game
Roper Center for Public Opinion Research

See also
Roeper (disambiguation)